Nikolayevsky (masculine), Nikolayevskaya (feminine), or Nikolayevskoye (neuter) may refer to:
Yuri Nikolaevsky (1937–2004), Soviet/Ukrainian chess player
Mykolaiv Oblast (Nikolayevskaya oblast), an oblast of Ukraine
Nikolayevsky District (disambiguation), several districts in the countries of the former Soviet Union
Nikolayevskoye Urban Settlement, several municipal urban settlements in Russia
Nikolayevsky (rural locality) (Nikolayevskaya, Nikolayevskoye), several rural localities in Russia
Nikolayevsky Rail Terminal (disambiguation), several rail terminals in Russia
Nikolayevsky Fortress Infantry Regiment, fortress infantry regiments of the Imperial Russian Army

See also
Nikolayevsk (disambiguation)
Nikolayev (disambiguation)
Nikolayevka (disambiguation)